Archicolpodes fukiensis is a species of beetle in the family Carabidae, the only species in the genus Archicolpodes.

References

Platyninae